John Melgar Smith (1872 – August 17, 1947) was an American businessman and politician.

Born on a farm near Carthage, Illinois, Smith lived in Minnesota 1891–1895 working as a railroad telegraph operator and station agent. In 1895, he moved to Shell Lake, Wisconsin, where he worked in the cooperative, banking, and lumber industries. In 1938, he was elected State Treasurer, as a Republican, serving until his death on August 17, 1947.

References

}

1872 births
1947 deaths
Businesspeople from Wisconsin
People from Carthage, Illinois
People from Shell Lake, Wisconsin
State treasurers of Wisconsin
Wisconsin Republicans